Peter Richard Legh, 4th Baron Newton (6 April 1915 – 16 June 1992), was a British Conservative politician who held junior ministerial positions during the 1950s and 1960s.

Newton was the son of Richard Legh, 3rd Baron Newton and Helen Winifred Meysey-Thompson, daughter of Henry Meysey-Thompson, 1st Baron Knaresborough. His grandfather Thomas Wodehouse Legh, 2nd Baron Newton was also a Conservative politician and served as Paymaster-General during the First World War.

Newton was educated at Eton and Christ Church, Oxford, and served in the Second World War as a Major in the Grenadier Guards. After the war Newton was a member of the Hampshire County Council from 1949 to 1952 and from 1954 to 1955. In 1951 he was elected Member of Parliament for Petersfield, and served in the Conservative administrations of Churchill, Eden and Macmillan as Parliamentary Private Secretary to the Financial Secretary to the Treasury John Boyd-Carpenter from 1952 to 1953, as an Assistant Government Whip from 1953 to 1955, as a Lord Commissioner of the Treasury from 1955 to 1957, as Vice-Chamberlain of the Household from 1957 to 1959 and as Treasurer of the Household from 1959 to 1960. In 1960 Newton succeeded his father as 4th Baron Newton and took his seat in the House of Lords, causing a by-election in Petersfield which was won by the Conservative candidate, Joan Quennell.

He continued to serve under Macmillan and later Home as Captain of the Yeomen of the Guard and Assistant Chief Whip in the House of Lords from 1960 to 1962, as Joint Parliamentary Secretary to the Ministry of Health from 1962 to 1964 and as Minister of State for Education and Science in 1964.

In 1948 Newton married Priscilla Warburton, daughter of Captain John Egerton Warburton and widow of Major William Matthew Palmer, Viscount Wolmer, son and heir of Roundell Palmer, 3rd Earl of Selborne. They had two sons. Lord Newton died in June, 1992, aged 77. He was succeeded in the Barony by his elder son Richard Thomas Legh.

Arms

References

External links 
 

1915 births
1992 deaths
Legh, Peter
Grenadier Guards officers
British Army personnel of World War II
Legh, Peter
Conservative Party (UK) hereditary peers
Barons in the Peerage of the United Kingdom
Treasurers of the Household
Legh, Peter
Legh, Peter
Legh, Peter
Newton, B4
People educated at Eton College
Alumni of Christ Church, Oxford
People from Petersfield
Ministers in the Eden government, 1955–1957
Ministers in the Macmillan and Douglas-Home governments, 1957–1964